Robert Chyra (born 1974) is a paralympic athlete from Poland competing mainly in category F37 throwing events.

Robert competed in all three throws in the 2000 Summer Paralympics winning gold in the discus throw.  In 2004 he was unable to defend his title in the discus but did win a bronze medal in the shot put.  At the 2008 Summer Paralympics he again competed in the shot and discus but could only manage fourth and ninth respectively.

References

Living people
1974 births
Paralympic athletes of Poland
Athletes (track and field) at the 2000 Summer Paralympics
Athletes (track and field) at the 2004 Summer Paralympics
Athletes (track and field) at the 2008 Summer Paralympics
Paralympic gold medalists for Poland
Paralympic bronze medalists for Poland
Place of birth missing (living people)
Medalists at the 2000 Summer Paralympics
Medalists at the 2004 Summer Paralympics
Paralympic medalists in athletics (track and field)
Polish male discus throwers
Polish male shot putters
20th-century Polish people
21st-century Polish people